Dauti is an Albanian surname. Notable people with the surname include:

 Daut Dauti (born 1960), Kosovan journalist
 Sajmir Dauti (born 1938), Albanian footballer and coach

Albanian-language surnames